Chrome Azurol S is a histological dye used in biomedical research.

Chrome Azural S (CAS) is a common spectrophotometric reagent for detection of certain metals like aluminum which can be toxic in excess and can contribute to people with neurodegenerative disorders. CAS is used to provide quantitative and qualitative information on molecules of interest like aluminum and siderophores.  Qualitatively a color change can be observed while also allowing to quantitatively determine concentration of certain ions.

References

Staining dyes